The 2023 Nigerian Senate elections in Ondo State was held on 25 February 2023, to elect the 3 federal Senators from Ondo State, one from each of the state's three senatorial districts. The elections coincided with the 2023 presidential election, as well as other elections to the Senate and elections to the House of Representatives; with state elections being held two weeks later. Primaries were held between 4 April and 9 June 2022.

Background
In the previous Senate elections, only one of the three incumbent senators were returned as Robert Ajayi Boroffice (APC-Central) was re-elected while Tayo Alasoadura (APC-North) and Yele Omogunwa (APC-South) were defeated. Patrick Ayo Akinyelure defeated Alasoadura with 33% of the vote while PDP challenger Nicholas Tofowomo unseated Omogunwa with 43%; in the central seat, Boroffice was re-elected with 30%. These results were a part of the continuation of the state's continued competitiveness as four parties won at least one House of Representatives seat, the APC won a majority in the state House of Assembly, and Buhari narrowly won the state in the presidential election. In 2020, incumbent Governor Rotimi Akeredolu held the governorship.

Overview

Summary

Ondo Central 

The Ondo Central Senatorial District covers the local government areas of Akure North, Akure South, Idanre, Ifedore, Ondo East, and Ondo West. Incumbent Patrick Ayo Akinyelure (PDP), who was elected with 33.1% of the vote in 2019, sought re-election but lost renomination.

General election

Results

Ondo North 

The Ondo North Senatorial District covers the local government areas of Akoko North-East, Akoko North-West, Akoko South-East, Akoko South-West, Ose, and Owo. Incumbent Robert Ajayi Boroffice (APC) was elected with 30.3% of the vote in 2019. In April 2022, Boroffice announced that he would run for president instead of seeking re-election; however, Amosun withdrew on the date of the APC primary in favour of eventual nominee Bola Tinubu.

General election

Results

Ondo South 

The Ondo South Senatorial District covers the local government areas of Ese Odo, Ilaje, Ile Oluji/Okeigbo, Irele, Odigbo, and Okitipupa. Incumbent Nicholas Tofowomo (PDP), who was elected with 43.0% of the vote in 2019, sought re-election but lost renomination.

General election

Results

See also 
 2023 Nigerian Senate election
 2023 Nigerian elections
 2023 Ondo State elections

References 

Ondo State senatorial elections
2023 Ondo State elections
Ondo State Senate elections